Affirmative may refer to:

Pertaining to truth
An answer that shows agreement or acceptance, such as "yes"
Affirmative (linguistics), a positive (non-negated) sentence or clause
Affirmative (policy debate), the team which affirms the resolution
Affirmative action

See also
Affirmation (disambiguation)